"Loving the Sound" is the first single from five-piece British-Irish doo-wop boy band The Overtones to be released from their second studio album, Higher (2012). The single was released in the United Kingdom as a digital download on 14 September 2012.

Music video
A music video to accompany the release of "Loving the Sound" was first released onto YouTube on 3 September 2012 at a total length of three minutes and twenty-eight seconds.

Live performances
On 29 September 2012 the band performed the song on Red or Black? as part of a three-song medley. They also performed the song on This Morning.

Track listing

Chart performance

Release history

References

External links
 The Overtones Official Website

2012 singles
2012 songs
Songs written by Phil Thornalley
Warner Music Group singles